The streaky seedeater (Crithagra striolata) is a species of finch in the family Fringillidae.  It is found in Burundi, Democratic Republic of the Congo, Eritrea, Ethiopia, Kenya, Rwanda, South Sudan, Tanzania, Uganda, and Zambia.

Phylogeny
The streaky seedeater was formerly placed in the genus Serinus but phylogenetic analysis using mitochondrial and nuclear DNA sequences found that the genus was polyphyletic. The genus was therefore split and a number of species including the streaky seedeater were moved to the resurrected genus Crithagra.

Habitat
In the Degua Tembien mountains, the bird was found to be a breeding resident of woodland edges, scrubland and forest edges.

Gallery

References

streaky seedeater
Birds of Sub-Saharan Africa
Birds of East Africa
streaky seedeater
Taxonomy articles created by Polbot